The 14203 / 04 Varanasi Lucknow Intercity Express is an Express train belonging to Indian Railways - Northern Railway zone that runs between Varanasi Junction & Lucknow NR in India.

It operates as train number 14203 from Varanasi Junction to Lucknow NR and as train number 14204 in the reverse direction serving the state of Uttar Pradesh.

It is one of 3 trains that run between Varanasi Junction to Lucknow NR, the others being 14219/20 Varanasi Lucknow Express & 14227 / 28 Varuna Express.

Coaches
The 14203 / 04 Varanasi Lucknow Intercity Express has 1 AC Chair Car, 11 General Unreserved & 2 SLR (Seating cum Luggage Rake) Coaches. It does not carry a Pantry car coach. 
 
As is customary with most train services in India, Coach Composition may be amended at the discretion of Indian Railways depending on demand.

Service

As the average speed of the train is below , as per Indian Railways rules, its fare does not include a Superfast surcharge.

Routeing
The 14203 / 04 Varanasi Lucknow Intercity Express runs from Varanasi Junction via Janghai Junction, Amethi, Rae Bareli Junction to Lucknow NR.

Traction
As the route is now fully electrified, it is hauled by a Ghaziabad based WAP 7 or WAP 4 for its entire journey.

Operation
14203 / 04 Varanasi Lucknow Intercity Express runs on a daily basis in both directions.

See also
 Dedicated Intercity trains of India

References

External links

 Nr.indianrailways.gov.in
 Irctcin.wordpress.com

Passenger trains originating from Varanasi
Passenger trains originating from Lucknow
Railway services introduced in 2003
Intercity Express (Indian Railways) trains